Bartholomew Lloyd (1772–1837) was an Irish mathematician and academic whose entire career was spent at Trinity College Dublin. As Erasmus Smith's Professor of Mathematics there, he promoted significant curricular reforms, including the introduction of the teaching of calculus. Later he served as Provost of the college.

Life
Born at New Ross, County Wexford, 5 February 1772, he was son of Humphrey Lloyd, himself the son of the Rev. Bartholomew Lloyd of the Abbey House of New Ross. His father died while he was still a boy, and an uncle, the Rev. John Lloyd, rector of Ferns and Kilbride, to whose care he had been given, also died shortly, so that he was left to struggle for himself. He entered Trinity College Dublin, in 1787 as a pensioner. In 1790 he was elected a Scholar of the College, in 1792 graduated B.A., and in 1796 obtained a junior fellowship. He graduated M.A. in the same year, B.D. in 1805, and D.D. in 1808.

In 1813 Lloyd was appointed Erasmus Smith's Professor of Mathematics on the resignation of William Magee, and in 1822, Erasmus Smith's Professor of Natural and Experimental Philosophy in succession to William Davenport. In both chairs he made a radical change in the methods of teaching, and was the first to introduce French mathematical innovations into Trinity College, including the teaching of the calculus.

In 1821 and again in 1823 and 1825 he was elected regius professor of Greek in the university, and in 1823 and again in 1827 Archbishop King's lecturer in divinity. In 1831 he was elected Provost of the college, in succession to Samuel Kyle who became bishop of Cork and Ross.

Trinity's magnetic observatory was founded through Lloyd's influence. In 1835 he was appointed president of the Royal Irish Academy, and in the same year acted as president of the British Association meeting at Dublin. His inaugural address dealt mainly with "the correspondence of the objects of science with divine revelation".

Lloyd died suddenly of apoplexy, 24 November 1837, and was buried in the college chapel. The Lloyd Exhibitions were founded by subscription in 1839 in his memory. A marble bust of him by Thomas Kirk stood in the library of Trinity College.

Works

In addition to scientific papers, Lloyd was author of:

 1819: A Treatise on Analytic Geometry, London. 
 1822: Discourses, chiefly Doctrinal, delivered in the Chapel of Trinity College, Dublin, London. 
 1826: An Elementary Treatise of Mechanical Philosophy Dublin, link from Internet Archive

Family
Lloyd was married young to Eleanor McLaughlin, by whom he had ten children, four sons and six daughters. The eldest was Humphrey Lloyd. The diplomat Charles Dalton Clifford Lloyd was a grandson, son of Colonel Robert Clifford Lloyd and Annie Savage.

Legacy 
A plaque to Lloyd was erected at the Tholsel, New Ross in 2018 organised by the National Committee for Commemorative Plaques in Science and Technology. It was unveiled by Trinity Provost, Professor Patrick Prendergast.

References

Attribution

1772 births
1837 deaths
Alumni of Trinity College Dublin
Classical scholars of Trinity College Dublin
Irish classical scholars
Irish mathematicians
Provosts of Trinity College Dublin
Scholars of Trinity College Dublin
Presidents of the Royal Irish Academy